Spitz (derived from the German word spitz 'pointed') is a type of domestic dog characterized by long, thick, and often white fur, and pointed ears and muzzles. The tail often curls over the dog's back or droops. While all of the breeds resemble primitive dogs, smaller breeds resemble foxes, while larger breeds resemble jackals, coyotes, wolves, and even dingoes.

The exact origins of spitz dogs are not known, though most of the spitzes seen today originate from the Arctic region or Siberia. The type was described as Canis pomeranus by Johann Friedrich Gmelin in his revision of Systema Naturae in 1788.

Characteristics
Spitzes are well suited to living in harsh northern climates. They often have an insulating, waterproof undercoat that is denser than the topcoat to trap warmth. Small, upright ears help to reduce the risk of frostbite, square proportions and thick fur that grows on the paws protects the dogs from sharp ice. Many spitz breeds, like the Japanese Akita and Chow Chow, retain wolf-like characteristics like independence, suspiciousness, and aggression towards unfamiliar humans and other dogs, and they require much training and socialization when they are puppies before they become manageable in an urban environment. Some, such as the Karelian Bear Dog, are more difficult to train as companion dogs. Some breeds, such as the Pomeranian, have manes.  Several spitz breeds (such as huskies) are bred for one purpose only. However it is common for many spitz breeds (such as the Russian laikas) to be general purpose dogs in their native lands, used for hunting, hauling, herding, and guarding.

Companions and toys
Spitzes, with their thick fur, fluffy ruffs, curled tails and small muzzles and ears, have been bred into non-working dogs designed to be companions or lap dogs. This trend is most evident in the tiny Pomeranian, which was originally a much larger dog closer to the size of a Keeshond before being bred down to make an acceptable court animal.

The Keeshond, the Wolfspitz variety of the German Spitz, is an affectionate, loyal, and very energetic pet that was bred as a watchdog for barges (hence the name Dutch Barge Dog). Often, these breeds are recognized for their "smiling" mouths. Other spitzes that have been bred away from working uses are the American Eskimo Dog, Alaskan Klee Kai, German Spitz, Volpino Italiano and Japanese Spitz.

Spitz breeds

Sled dogs

Hunting dogs

Herding dogs

Asian breeds

Companion dogs

Extinct breeds

References

External links
 

Dog types